David Roderick Shukman (born 30 May 1958) is a British journalist, and the former science editor of BBC News.

Early life
Shukman was born in 1958 in St Pancras, London. He is of Jewish ancestry – his grandfather, whom he is named after, was part of the Jewish community who lived in Baranow, Congress Poland which was then part of the Russian Empire, before emigrating and settling in the United Kingdom. His father was Harold Shukman, a Russian scholar at St Antony's College, Oxford; his mother was Ann King-Farlow, also a Russian scholar, of writers such as Alexander Men (a Russian theologian). 

Shukman attended the Dragon School and Eton College, then earned a bachelor's degree in geography at Durham University in 1980. and was a member of Hatfield College.

Career
Shukman worked at the Coventry Evening Telegraph from 1980 to 1983 when he joined the BBC. He was a Northern Ireland reporter from 1985 to 1987, then the Defence Correspondent (TV) from 1987 to 1995. From then until 1999 he was the European Correspondent, and broadening his coverage in 1999, he became the World Affairs Correspondent until 2003, when he became Environment and Science correspondent. 

In January 2012 Shukman was appointed as the BBC's first science editor. Shukman said: "It's a privilege to be given this new role as part of the BBC's drive to enhance its science coverage. The science story has never been so compelling and I'm delighted to be given this opportunity to lead our reporting and analysis of it."

Personal life
In 1998, Shukman married Jessica Pryce-Jones, an author and executive coach. They have three children. He is a member of the Frontline Club.

Bibliography
 Brown, Ben and Shukman, David, All Necessary Means : Inside the Gulf War, 1994
 Shukman, David, The Sorcerer's Challenge: Fears and Hopes for the Weapons of the Next Millennium, 1996
 Shukman, David, Tomorrow's War: The Threat of High-Technology Weapons, 1996
 Shukman, David, Reporting Live from the End of the Word. Profile Books, 2010.
 Shukman, David, Reporting Live from the End of the World , 2011
 Shukman, David, An Iceberg As Big As Manhattan, 2011

See also
 Environmental journalism
 The British Environment and Media Awards

References

1958 births
Living people
People educated at Eton College
Alumni of Hatfield College, Durham
British Jews
Science journalists
Environmental journalists
BBC science journalists
Fellows of the Royal Geographical Society
People educated at The Dragon School
Jewish journalists
Shukman family
Fould family